Kangaarsuk Island (old spelling: Kangârssuk) is an uninhabited island in Avannaata municipality in northwestern Greenland.

Geography 
Kangaarsuk Island is located in the outer belt of islands in Tasiusaq Bay, in the central part of Upernavik Archipelago. The inner waterways of the bay separate it from Illunnguit Island in the northwest, and from Tasiusaq Island in the north. It is one of the low-lying islands buffering Tasiusaq Island from the west. The highest point on the island is an unnamed  point in the center.

References

Uninhabited islands of Greenland
Tasiusaq Bay
Islands of the Upernavik Archipelago